The Shanghai Institute of Technology (SIT) is a public application-orientated university in Shanghai, China. 

Authorized by Chinese Ministry of Education in April, 2000, SIT was established by merging the former three institutions which had a history of over fifty years.

Location
SIT is located in south-western Shanghai, adjacent to the Cao Hejing hi-tech park.

Administration 
While conducting the three-year vocational education, SIT mainly devotes itself for running of the bachelor's degree programs. The Institute consists of a Modern Education Centre, two departments and eleven schools, all of which cover 'materials science and engineering, mechanical and automation engineering, computer science and information engineering, civil engineering and architecture, environment and energy engineering, chemical engineering, biotechnology and food processing engineering, art and design, economics and business administration, foreign languages, social sciences among others. Among them, the disciplines of material processing engineering, applied chemistry, light-industry technique and engineering, art design and mechanic manufacturing and automation have been selected by Shanghai Municipal government, Shanghai Municipal Education Commission and SIT as Key incubated Disciplines. The discipline of Applied Chemistry has been authorized to run the postgraduate programme.

Faculty staff

There are a total of over 1800 staff, and among them 600 are full-time teachers, over two hundred are supervisors for master's degree and doctor degree candidates, as well as professors and associate professors.

Students
Currently, there are approximately over 17,500 registered full-time students in the institute.

Research 
Over the past few years, SIT successfully built a dynamic and high-leveled academic team, engaged in both teaching activities and scientific research with quite a number of outstanding guides in the course of key disciplines and master teachers in core courses for different programs. The past few years have witnessed such substantial progress in scientific research that SIT has been repeatedly awarded prizes covering the Progress in Scientific Research and Success in Educational Research at the state, ministerial or municipal levels. Presently, SIT has been undertaking numerous projects of National Natural Science Foundation (NSF), the earlier stage programs of National Basic Research Program, Shanghai Natural Science Foundation, Shanghai Municipal Dawn Plan and other projects at provincial and municipal levels.

Exchange 
Until now SIT has been maintaining close ties with tertiary universities of the countries like Germany, Ireland, U.S.A., Australia, Canada, U.K., France, New Zealand, Japan in conducting the exchange programmes in scientific and technological research and in the establishment and implementation of collaborative schemes of cooperation of tertiary education, the latter of which covers the programs in 'Electronic Engineering and Automation, Mechanical Design, Manufacturing and Automation, Applied Chemistry and Economic Administration.

SIT has been making determined effort to cultivate its students in an all-round way, namely, morally, intellectually, physically and train them to become advanced engineering and technological personnel who are armed with knowledge of modern science and a remarkable ability in application and problem-solving undertaking. SIT endeavors to build the university into a high-leveled, application-oriented, multiple-disciplined university of higher learning with its outstanding features and into "a cradle for engineers? The graduates of SIT are welcomed and favorably appraised by various circles in Shanghai and other parts of China. Presently SIT is entering a new phase of development with the scope for running the university being expanded and connotation construction being strengthened.

References

External links
Shanghai Institute of Technology Official site
3d map of Shanghai Institute of Technology

Universities and colleges in Shanghai
Technical universities and colleges in China
1954 establishments in China
Educational institutions established in 1954